In probability theory and directional statistics, a wrapped Cauchy distribution is a wrapped probability distribution that results from the "wrapping" of the Cauchy distribution around the unit circle. The Cauchy distribution is sometimes known as a Lorentzian distribution, and the wrapped Cauchy distribution may sometimes be referred to as a wrapped Lorentzian distribution.

The wrapped Cauchy distribution is often found in the field of spectroscopy where it is used to analyze diffraction patterns (e.g. see Fabry–Pérot interferometer).

Description 

The probability density function of the wrapped Cauchy distribution is:

Expressing the above pdf in terms of the characteristic function of the Cauchy distribution yields:

The PDF may also be expressed in terms of the circular variable z = eiθ and the complex parameter ζ = ei(μ+iγ)

where, as shown below, ζ = ⟨z⟩.

In terms of the circular variable  the circular moments of the wrapped Cauchy distribution are the characteristic function of the Cauchy distribution evaluated at integer arguments:

where  is some interval of length . The first moment is then the average value of z, also known as the mean resultant, or mean resultant vector:

The mean angle is

and the length of the mean resultant is
 

yielding a circular variance of 1 − R.

Estimation of parameters 

A series of N measurements  drawn from a wrapped Cauchy distribution may be used to estimate certain parameters of the distribution. The average of the series  is defined as

and its expectation value will be just the first moment:

In other words,  is an unbiased estimator of the first moment. If we assume that the peak position  lies in the interval , then Arg will be a (biased) estimator of the peak position .

and its expectation value is

In other words, the statistic

Entropy 

The information entropy of the wrapped Cauchy distribution is defined as:

where  is any interval of length . The logarithm of the density of the wrapped Cauchy distribution may be written as a Fourier series in :

where

which yields:

(c.f. Gradshteyn and Ryzhik 4.224.15) and

(c.f. Gradshteyn and Ryzhik 4.397.6). The characteristic function representation for the wrapped Cauchy distribution in the left side of the integral is:

where . Substituting these expressions into the entropy integral, exchanging the order of integration and summation, and using the orthogonality of the cosines, the entropy may be written:

The series is just the Taylor expansion for the logarithm of  so the entropy may be written in closed form as:

Circular Cauchy distribution

If X is Cauchy distributed with median μ and scale parameter γ, then the complex variable

has unit modulus and is distributed on the unit circle with density:

where

and ψ expresses the two parameters of the associated linear Cauchy distribution for x as a complex number:

It can be seen that the circular Cauchy distribution has the same functional form as the wrapped Cauchy distribution in z and ζ (i.e. fWC(z,ζ)). The circular Cauchy distribution is a reparameterized wrapped Cauchy distribution:

The distribution  is called the circular Cauchy distribution (also the complex Cauchy distribution) with parameters μ and γ. (See also McCullagh's parametrization of the Cauchy distributions and Poisson kernel for related concepts.)

The circular Cauchy distribution expressed in complex form has finite moments of all orders

for integer n ≥ 1. For |φ| < 1, the transformation

is holomorphic on the unit disk, and the transformed variable U(Z, φ) is distributed as complex Cauchy with parameter U(ζ, φ).

Given a sample z1, ..., zn of size n > 2, the maximum-likelihood equation

can be solved by a simple fixed-point iteration:

starting with ζ(0) = 0. The sequence of likelihood values is non-decreasing, and the solution is unique for samples containing at least three distinct values.

The maximum-likelihood estimate for the median and scale parameter of a real Cauchy sample is obtained by the inverse transformation:

The density of the maximum-likelihood estimator at t in the unit disk is necessarily of the form:

where

.

Formulae for p3 and p4 are available.

See also 

 Wrapped distribution
 Dirac comb
 Wrapped normal distribution
 Circular uniform distribution
 McCullagh's parametrization of the Cauchy distributions

References 

 
 

Continuous distributions
Directional statistics